Ignite My Insanity is the second studio album by American hard rock band Projected. The album is the band's first release in five years, since the band's 2012 debut album, Human. It is a double album, featuring 21 tracks, and was released on July 21, 2017.

Writing and recording 
According to Connolly, drums and main guitars recorded at Architekt Music in Butler, New Jersey, with Mike Ferretti. The band spent about 10 days in the studio tracking all the main parts, then moved to Connolly's home studio 1119 in Orlando, Florida to track vocals, solos and overdubs. Also they tracked all bass while out on tour with Sevendust in Canada and the Midwest.

Ignite My Insanity is a double album featuring 21 songs. The album features two songs co-written with guitarist Mark Tremonti, and one song co-written by drummer Morgan Rose.

Release and promotion
The album was officially announced in May 2017, with a prospective release window of July, later narrowed down to July 21, 2017. The first single from the album, "Reload", was released on June 11, 2017. A music video was released on the same day, primarily focused on the band performing in front of a white and red backdrop. A second single, "Ignite", was released on July 16, 2017, alongside its own respective music video, featuring the band performing interspersed with clips of Connolly attempting to reach out to a woman.

Track listing

Personnel

Band
 John Connolly – lead vocals, guitar, co-producer
 Eric Friedman – guitar, backing vocals
 Vinnie Hornsby – bass guitar
 Scott Phillips – drums

Production and design
Mike Ferretti – recording engineer, mixing, editing, co-producer
Shane Stanton – assistant engineer
Andy VanDette – mastering
Jean Michel – design
William Burkle – photography
Paul Mashburn – photography

Charts

References

2017 albums
Projected albums